The sixth legislative assembly election of Tamil Nadu was held on 10 June 1977. All India Anna Dravida Munnetra Kazhagam (AIADMK) won the election defeating its rival Dravida Munnetra Kazhagam (DMK). M. G. Ramachandran (simply known as M.G.R in the state), the AIADMK founder and a leading Tamil film actor, was sworn in as Chief Minister for the first time. The election was a four-cornered contest between the AIADMK, DMK, the Indian National Congress (INC) and the Janata Party. Earlier in 1972, M.G.R had founded the AIADMK following his expulsion from the DMK after differences arose between him and DMK leader M. Karunanidhi. On 31 January 1976, Karunanidhi's government was dismissed by the central government of Prime Minister Indira Gandhi citing non-co-operation for MISA and President's rule was imposed on the state. Karunanidhi had been at odds with Indira Gandhi over his opposition to Emergency and allied with Janata Party founded by Jayaprakash Narayan. M.G.R remained as Chief Minister until he died in 1987, winning the next two elections held in 1980 and 1984. Due to this feat, M.G.R inadvertently became an example for entry of famous actors to enter politics, with a hope that they too may become Chief minister one day. then Telugu superstar N.T.R followed M.G.R's suit in 1983 and won the Andhra Pradesh general Elections to become the Chief Minister of Andhra Pradesh. Since then, no other actor has been able to recreate M.G.R's achievements in electoral Politics.

Background

Split in Dravida Munnetra Kazhagam
DMK gradually weakened in the years after the previous election due to several splits caused by the exit of many influential leaders including M.G.R. The popularity of the party was further undermined by widespread corruption allegations which was purposely aired by M.G.R who was in close relationship with Indian National Congress (INC). Cracks began to appear in Dravida Munnetra Kazhagam before 1971 election. K. A. Mathiazhagan was removed from office of the minister of Finance as he was considered a serious threat to Karunanidhi's leadership. Sathyavani Muthu, an influential dalit leader left the party in 1972 citing lack of concern for dalit issues within the party and formed Thazhthapattor Munnetra Kazhagam. M.G.R was expelled on 10 October 1972, in a disciplinary action for his attacks against party leadership for alleged corruption and dictatorial behaviour. He formed a new party All India Anna Dravida Munnetra Kazhagam. AIADMK won the Dindigul by-election held in 1973. V. R. Nedunchezhiyan along with some senior party leaders left Dravida Munnetra Kazhagam in March 1977 to form Makkal Dravida Munnetra Kazhagam.

Emergency

Emergency, which was declared in June 1975 had a mixed reception in Tamil Nadu. Jayaprakash Narayan's opposition movement did not receive much support in Tamil Nadu due to his association with the DMK government, which had its own trouble due to accusations of corruption. K. Kamaraj did not come in support of Jayaprakash Narayan due to his association with DMK despite the fact he disapproved of Indira Gandhi's actions. DMK executive council called the Emergency unnecessary and undemocratic on 27 June and party leaders condemned it in several statewide meetings. Emergency regulations and censorship were not strictly enforced in Tamil Nadu unlike in other states. All India Anna Dravida Munnetra Kazhagam and Communist Party of India continued to support Indira Gandhi. M. G. Ramachandran even visited Delhi to extend his support to Indira Gandhi. It was under these circumstances Karunanidhi's government was dismissed by the Government of India on 31 January 1976.

Death of Kamaraj and Rajaji
Kamaraj, leader of Indian National Congress (Organisation), who remarked in 1972, "Randu Katchigalum Orey Kuttaiyil Oorina Mattaigal (both parties, the DMK and the AIADMK, are like fronds dipped in the same bog or tarred by the same brush)." died in 1975. Indian National Congress (Indira) faction could not establish a foothold in Tamil Nadu until his death. After his death, Indian National Congress (Organisation) lost its identity as a party, and a large number of its members led by G. K. Moopanar merged with Indira Congress. The remaining chose not to join with Dravida Munnetra Kazhagam, but rather joined the Janata Party and later remained largely uncommitted. Swatantra Party lost much of its power after the death of C. Rajagopalachari in 1972 and did not contest the election. Most of its members joined the newly formed Janata Party.

Coalitions
This election was a four cornered contest. The AIADMK allied itself with the Communist Party of India (Marxist), while INC(I) and Communist Party of India (CPI) contested as allies. The DMK and Janata Party (JNP) contested the elections alone. The AIADMK did not field any candidate in the Usilampatti Constituency in support of the Forward Bloc leader P.K. Mookiah Thevar. Similarly the AIADMK also supported the Indian Union Muslim League (IUML) candidate M. Abdul Latheef in the Vaniyambadi Constituency. In the parliamentary elections that occurred just three months prior to this elections, there had been two major alliances – the AIADMK led AIADMK-INC-CPI coalition and the DMK led DMK-NCO-JNP-CPM coalition. But in the months that followed the parliamentary election, these coalitions fell apart.

Seat allotments

AIADMK Front

†: Forward Bloc contested in 6 different constituencies, but only the Usilampatti constituency contested by P.K.M. Thevar was supported by AIADMK

Congress Front

DMK

Janata Party

Voting and results
Polling for the election was held on 10 June 1977. Turnout among the eligible voters was 61.58%.

Results by Pre-Poll Alliance

|-
! style="background-color:#E9E9E9;text-align:left;vertical-align:top;" |Alliance/Party
!style="width:4px" |
! style="background-color:#E9E9E9;text-align:right;" |Seats won
! style="background-color:#E9E9E9;text-align:right;" |Change
! style="background-color:#E9E9E9;text-align:right;" |Popular Vote
! style="background-color:#E9E9E9;text-align:right;" |Vote %
! style="background-color:#E9E9E9;text-align:right;" |Adj. %‡
|-
! style="background-color:#009900; color:white"|AIADMK+ alliance
! style="background-color: " | 
| 144
| +142
| 5,734,692
|style="text-align:center;vertical-align:middle;" colspan=2 | 33.5%
|-
|AIADMK
! style="background-color: #008000" |
| 130
| +130
| 5,194,876
| 30.4%
| 35.4%
|-
|CPI(M)
! style="background-color: #000080" |
| 12
| +12
| 477,835
| 2.8%
| 33.0%
|-
|FBL
! style="background-color: #800000" |
| 1
| –
| 35,361
| 0.2%
| 62.0%
|-
|IND
! style="background-color: olive" |
| 1
| –
| 26,620
| 0.2%
| 42.9%
|-
! style="background-color:#FF0000; color:white"|DMK
! style="background-color: " |
| 48
| -136
| 4,258,771
|style="text-align:center;vertical-align:middle;" colspan=2 | 24.9%
|-
|DMK
! style="background-color: #FF0000" |
| 48
| -136
| 4,258,771
| 24.9%
| 25.3%
|-
! style="background-color:#00FFFF; color:black"|Congress alliance
! style="background-color: #00FFFF" |
| 32
| +24
| 3,491,490
|style="text-align:center;vertical-align:middle;" colspan=2 | 20.4%
|-
|INC
! style="background-color: #00FFFF" |
| 27
| +27
| 2,994,535
| 17.5%
| 20.8%
|-
|CPI
! style="background-color: #0000FF" |
| 5
| -3
| 496,955
| 2.9%
| 20.4%
|-
! style="background-color:yellow; color:black"|Janata
! style="background-color:yellow" |
| 10
| +10
| 2,851,884
|style="text-align:center;vertical-align:middle;" colspan=2 | 16.7%
|-
|JNP
! style="background-color: #FFFF00" |
| 10
| +10
| 2,851,884
| 16.7%
| 16.8%
|-
! style="background-color:gray; color:white"|Others
! style="background-color:gray" |
| 1
| -7
| 751,712
|style="text-align:center;vertical-align:middle;" colspan=2 | 4.4%
|-
|IND
! style="background-color: #666666" |
| 1
| -7
| 751,712
| 4.4%
| –
|-
| style="text-align:center;" |Total
! style="background-color: " |
| 234
| –
| 17,108,146
| 100%
| style="text-align:center;" | –
|-
|}
‡: Vote % reflects the percentage of votes the party received compared to the entire electorate that voted in this election. Adjusted (Adj.) Vote %, reflects the % of votes the party received per constituency that they contested.
Sources: Election Commission of India 

 By constituency Key:'''

See also
 Elections in Tamil Nadu
 Legislature of Tamil Nadu
 Government of Tamil Nadu

References

External links
 Election Commission of India

State Assembly elections in Tamil Nadu
1970s in Tamil Nadu
Tamil Nadu